Middle Class Abbayi, also known as MCA, is a 2017 Indian Telugu-language action comedy film written and directed by Venu Sriram, Hrishikesh Bhargava and produced by Dil Raju. The film stars Nani, Sai Pallavi and Bhumika Chawla. Devi Sri Prasad composed the soundtrack and score.

The film was released theatrically on 21 December 2017 and received mixed reviews from critics, but became a clean box office hit. It was remade in Hindi as Nikamma (2022).

Plot 
Nani is a middle-class youth with an eidetic memory, who stays at his uncle's house in Hyderabad. He has issues with his brother's house because he dislikes his sister-in-law Jyothi, an RTO officer. Nani's elder brother asks him to go to Warangal to aid Jyothi in the new place. He falls for Pallavi, who proposes to him in the first encounter. Nani realizes that Pallavi is Jyothi's sister after she arrives to live with them. She tells him that she has seen her during his brother's wedding and has been in love with him. Jyothi learns about Nani and Pallavi's love towards each other and pursues Pallavi's father (Jyothi's uncle) to accept their relationship, who refuses. Jyothi tries to pursue Nani to become a software engineer, but to no avail.

Meanwhile, Jyothi seizes two buses with the same number which belongs to Siva Shakti Travels, owned by a gangster named Warangal Siva, who threatens Jyothi with dire consequences. Nani learns about Jyothi's sacrifices and realizes his mistake. When Siva threatens Jyothi at the RTO office, Nani thrashes him in public and warns him. Nani and Siva agree to bet on Jyothi's life without letting anyone know about this. Siva plans various strategies to murder Jyothi, but Nani intelligently rescues her, Siva kidnaps Jyothi and hides her in the one of the bus which she seized. Nani ask Jyothi's whereabouts to Siva, who commits suicide and is taken to the hospital. Nani figures out the bus and saves Jyothi. Siva survives, but loses his memory and starts his life afresh. Nani marries Pallavi while fooling her father that he is a software engineer.

Cast 

 Nani as Nani
 Sai Pallavi as Pallavi aka Chinni, Jyothi's sister, Nani's love interest
 Bhumika Chawla as Jyothi, Nani's sister-in-law and Warangal RTO officer
 Vijay Varma as Shiva Shakti aka Warangal Shiva, a gangster who owns Shiva Shakti Travels
 Naresh as Nani's uncle
 Aamani as Nani's aunt
 Rajeev Kanakala as Ravi, Nani's elder brother
 Priyadarshi Pullikonda as Darshan "Darshi"
 Posani Krishna Murali as Pallavi's father
 Pavitra Lokesh as Siva's mother
 Vennela Kishore as Software Consultant and Nani's boss
 Mahadevan as RTO Officer
 Racha Ravi as Nani's friend
 Ashritha Vemuganti as Medical Doctor
 Subhalekha Sudhakar as D. Srinivas 
 Rakesh Varre as Rakesh

Music 
The music of this film is composed by Devi Sri Prasad and was distributed by Aditya Music.

Release
The film was released on 21 December 2017. The Times of India reported that the film was released in over 900 screens. The theatrical rights of the film were sold at a cost of ₹30 crore. BlueSky Cinemas have acquired the distribution rights of the film in the United States for ₹3.50 crore. Sakshi Post reported that the film was released in over 150 screens across North America.

The film was also dubbed and released in Tamil under the title Middle Class Aambala.

Reception

Box office 
On its opening day, the film collected a total gross of ₹28 crore worldwide. As of 8 January 2018, the film grossed US$1.07 million (₹6.85 crore) at the United States box office. By the end of its theatrical run,  Middle Class Abbayi grossed ₹70 crore worldwide, with the distributors' share of ₹40 crore.

Critical response 
Neeshita Nyayapati of The Times of India gave a rating of 2.5 out of 5 and wrote that "MCA is good enough for a one-time watch, especially if you're a Nani fan or a sucker for family dramas". Opining the same Sify wrote that "MCA starts off well and engages the audiences with cute romance and some fun elements. The entire first half is neat and entertaining. However, it drifts away soon and turns too predictable. Nani and Sai Pallavi's romantic thread is the major highlight in this otherwise regular commercial movie that is too bland." Writing to The News Minute, Sowmya Rajendran felt that the film has some original ideas but turns predictable – like the middle-class kid who wants to become a rock star but ends up in engineering. She further wrote:"Middle Class Abbayi is a middling entertainer with a lot of fresh ideas that unnecessarily turns into a routine drama".

Firstpost stated that "MCA is not a bad film, but it also leaves you with a feeling that it could have been a lot more. In another era, a similar plotline, of a guy wanting to save a girl from the clutches of a villain, formed the basis of Mahesh Babu's Okkadu". Sangeetha Devi Dundoo of The Hindu wrote in her review: "Three versatile performers are the saving grace in this partly entertaining and partly middling film". Manoj Kumar R of The Indian Express wrote that "Venu has banked heavily on the charming performances of Nani and Pallavi to make MCA click with the audience, as his writing is unambitious and mostly filled with clichés like his idea of middle class".

Remake 
The film was remade in Hindi as Nikamma and released on 17 June 2022. Produced by Shabbir Khan Films and Sony Pictures India, the film features Abhimanyu Dassani, Shirley Setia and Shilpa Shetty reprising the lead roles played by Nani, Sai Pallavi and Bhumika Chawla respectively.

References

External links 

2017 films
2010s Telugu-language films
Films shot in Warangal
Films set in Telangana
2017 action comedy films
Indian action comedy films
Midlife crisis films
Indian family films
2017 masala films
2017 comedy films
Sri Venkateswara Creations films
Films scored by Devi Sri Prasad
Telugu films remade in other languages
Films about memory